The Angola women's national football team represents Angola in international women's football and it is controlled by the Angolan Football Federation. Their best place on the FIFA Rankings was the 82nd place, in December 2003. The only tournaments that they qualified were the 1995 and 2002 African Women's Championships, and their best finish was as Semi-Finalists in the 1995 tournament. Angola has, in contrast to many other African countries, has never suffered a heavy defeat. They have seldom lost by more than two goals.

Angola finished in third place at the African Championship in 1995. Angola also qualified for the Championship in 2002, where they beat Zimbabwe and South Africa, but lost to Cameroon by one goal. Since then, Angola have not qualified for the championships.

During qualification for the 2008 Olympics, Angola did not get any further than the first round, where they lost to Ghana. However, they did reach the final of the COSAFA Cup, where they met South Africa, who beat them 3–1.

History

Beginnings
Angola played their first game against South Africa on 7 January 1995, losing 3–1.

1995 African Women's Championship
Angola entered the 1995 African Women's Championship, against Cameroon, but it withdrew, thus Angola advanced by Walkover and in the Second Round, they played their first official match on the first leg of the Second Round, against South Africa on 7 January 1995; in where they lost by 3–1. The second leg, was a 3–3 draw at home. These results provoked the elimination of Angola due to a 6–4 aggregate, but the Welwitschias ended as Semi-Finalists, along with Ghana.

2002 African Women's Championship
Angola participated in the 2002 African Women's Championship qualifiers, against Equatorial Guinea. Both legs were won 3–0 and 3–1 respectively. Second Round matches where against Congo DR and First leg was won 1–0 and Second leg was lost also by 1–0, but won in penalties by 5–4 and qualified for the tournament who was held in Nigeria.

This time Angola was along with Zimbabwe, South Africa and Cameroon. The first match was against Zimbabwe and ended on a 1–1 draw with goal of the captain Irene Gonçalves at the 16 minutes. The same result occurred on the Second match against South Africa, but this time with goal of Jacinta Ramos at the 75 minutes. Last match was lost against Cameroon by 1–0 in a late Cameroonian goal at the 89 minutes, leaving Angola out of the tournament and the World Cup.

2006 African Women's Championship
The Welwitschias played the 2006 African Women's Championship/2007 FIFA Women's World Cup qualifiers against Equatorial Guinea in First round, winning 3–2 in the first leg, but losing 3–1 in the second leg, and losing in aggregate by 5–4. Angola did not reach both the 2006 African Women's Championship or the 2007 FIFA Women's World Cup who was held in China PR.

2007 All-Africa Games
Angola entered for the first time to the All-Africa Games Football tournament, in the qualifiers for the 2007 edition in Algeria. Their rival was South Africa. They won the first leg by 3–2 and lost the second by 4–0, ending with an aggregate of 6–3, thus being eliminated from the tournament.

2008 Olympic Games
The Welwitschias debuted on the Olympic Games football tournament qualifiers in the edition of 2008 edition, celebrated in China PR. Angola's first rival was Tanzania, but it withdrew; thus Angola advanced by walkover. In the Second Round, Angola played against Ghana, losing both matches by 2–1 and 2–0, ending with an aggregate of 4–1.

2010 African Women's Championship
Again, the team entered the 2010 African Women's Championship/2011 FIFA Women's World Cup qualifiers in the CAF First Round against Namibia and lost the First leg 2–1, leading 1–0 in the half-time, with goal of Irene Gonçalves at the 37 minutes. The Second leg was a 1–1 draw, when it was winning 1–0, again with a goal of Irene Gonçalves at the 51 minutes. Angola did not qualify for either both tournaments.

2011 All-Africa Games
Angola failed to qualify to the 2011 All-Africa Games, celebrated in Mozambique, after losing in aggregate to Zimbabwe by 3–1, after drawing 1–1 and lose 2–0. Also these matches were the last matches that Angola played to the date.

2012 Olympic Games
Despite being one year after the 2011 All-Africa Games, the 2012 Olympic Games Football Tournament qualification of Africa was held 4 months before the 2011 All-Africa Games qualifiers. Angola was paired with Namibia once again in a qualification round. They draw both matches by 2–2 and 0–0 respectively, but they lost due to the Away goals rule. Angola was eliminated of the tournament who took place in Great Britain

2014 African Women's Championship
Angola did not enter for the 2014 African Women's Championship/2015 FIFA Women's World Cup qualifiers, which was held in Namibia in Autumn 2014.

Team image

Home stadium
The Angola women's national football team plays their home matches on the Estádio Nacional de Ombaka.

Results and fixtures

The following is a list of match results in the last 12 months, as well as any future matches that have been scheduled.

Legend

2022

Head-to-head record
Statistics correct as of 23 June 2014

Coaching staff

Current coaching staff

As of July 2021

Manager history

Lurdes Lutonda (??–2021)
Souza Garcia(2021-

Players

Current squad
 The following players were called up for the 2022 COSAFA Women's Championship.
 Caps and goals accurate up to and including 7 April 2021.

Recent call-ups
 The following players have been called up to an Angola squad in the past 12 months.

Previous squads
COSAFA Women's Championship
 2020 COSAFA Women's Championship squad
 2021 COSAFA Women's Championship squad
 2022 COSAFA Women's Championship squad

Records

 Active players in bold, statistics correct as of 7 April 2021.

Most capped players

Top goalscorers

Honours
African Women's Championship
Semi-Finalist: (1) 1995
COSAFA Women's Championship
Runners-up: (1) 2008

Regional
COSAFA Women's Championship
 Runners-up: 2008

Competitive record

FIFA Women's World Cup

*Draws include knockout matches decided on penalty kicks.

Olympic Games

Africa Women Cup of Nations

African Games

COSAFA Women's Championship

*Draws include knockout matches decided on penalty kicks.

See also
Sport in Angola
Football in Angola
Women's football in Angola
Angola women's national under-20 football team
Angola women's national under-17 football team
Angola men's national football team

References

External links

1995 AWC Results at RSSSF.com
2002 AWC Results at RSSSF.com
2006 AWC Results at RSSSF.com
2007 All Africa Games Results at RSSSF.com
FIFA page 2010 AWC Results at CAF Preliminary matches for 2011 Women's World Cup

 
African women's national association football teams